Goodenia chambersii is a species of flowering plant in the family Goodeniaceae and is endemic to South Australia. It is an ascending shrub with toothed, broadly egg-shaped to round leaves, racemes or thyrses of yellow flowers and oval fruit.

Description

Taxonomy and naming
Goodenia chambersii was first formally described in 1859 by Ferdinand von Mueller in Fragmenta Phytographiae Australiae from material collected by John McDouall Stuart, possibly in 1858, in the ranges to the west of the Lake Eyre basin. The specific epithet (chambersii) honour James and John Chambers who sponsored McDouall Stuart's expeditions.

Distribution and habitat
Goodenia chambersii grows on stony slopes and near watercourse in central South Australia, near the Lake Eyre basin.

References

chambersii
Flora of South Australia
Plants described in 1859
Taxa named by Ferdinand von Mueller